Günəşli (known as Pokrovka until 2001) is a village in the Jalilabad Rayon of Azerbaijan.

References

External links

Populated places in Jalilabad District (Azerbaijan)